Dinakar S (born 21 September 1978) mononymously known as Dinakar Thoogudeepa is an Indian film director, actor and producer who mainly works in Kannada films. who started his film career as an actor from the movie Ayyo Pandu in 2004 later he worked as assistant director for few Kannada movies. He become full-fledged director from the Kannada movie Jothe Jotheyali in 2006

Early life 
Dinakar Thoogudeepa was born to actor Thoogudeepa Srinivas and Meena on 21 September 1978.

Filmography 
All films are in Kannada Language otherwise noted the Language

References 

1978 births
Living people
Indian male film actors
Indian film directors
Kannada film directors
Kannada film producers
Kannada actors